The 2013 Yukon/NWT Men's Curling Championship was held from January 11 to 13 at the Fort Smith Curling Club in Fort Smith, Northwest Territories. The winning team, skipped by Jamie Koe, represented the Northwest Territories and the Yukon at the 2013 Tim Hortons Brier in Edmonton, Alberta.

Since the Yukon Curling Association declared that Yukon would not be fielding any teams for the event, the Northwest Territories Men's Championship constituted the Yukon/NWT Men's Curling Championship.

Teams

Round-robin standings
Final round-robin standings

Round-robin results
All draw times are listed in Mountain Standard Time (UTC-7).

Draw 1
Friday, January 11, 1:30 pm

Draw 2
Friday, January 11, 6:00 pm

Draw 3
Saturday, January 12, 12:30 pm

Draw 4
Saturday, January 12, 4:30 pm

Draw 5
Sunday, January 13, 8:30 am

References

External links

Yukon NWT Men's Curling Championship
Curling in the Northwest Territories
Curling in Yukon
2013 in Yukon
2013 in the Northwest Territories